The Croatia Rally is an international rally racing event based in Zagreb, Croatia and is planned to be the third round of 2021 World Rally Championship. The event is organised by Automobile Clubs D.T. Motorsport and Cro Dakar Team with the support of Croatian Car and Karting Federation and was a round of the European Rally Championship from 2007 until 2013. The event was known in the past as Delta Rally and Croatia Delta Rally. It has been a tarmac rally since at least the late 1980s.

History

The very first Croatia Rally was held in 1974, under the name INA Delta TLX Rally. It took only three years to grow from a regional race into a national championship event of former Yugoslavia. From the very beginning, the main characteristic of the rally was the extremely long itineraries, which passed through Gorski Kotar, Lika, Primorje and Continental Croatia until the mid-1980s.

The first international recognition that the race experienced was in 1986, when it entered the FIA calendar. That same year, special stages located at Žumberak, Plešivica, Zagrebačka gora and Hrvatsko Zagorje were driven by the crews from Austria, Germany, Czechoslovakia. It was the beginning of the project with the goal of entering the European Championship. Again, in 1986, first nomination towards the FIA was sent. But, the race had to wait for the European pedigree for six years.

Despite the ongoing Croatian War of Independence, Delta Rally had become recognized internationally and was growing rapidly. Good organization has brought it a coefficient 10 by the year 1995, and a year later the organizer nominated it under the name Croatia Rally for the highest coefficient of the contemporary European Championship – 20. It took even eleven years until the prestigious series in Croatia.

In late 2006 FIA has reported that the European Championship (ERC) will spread. 34. Croatia Rally 2007. has entered the calendar as a third out of ten ERC events. The first ERC Croatia Rally was won by the domestic crew Juraj Šebalj and Toni Klinc in Mitsubishi Lancer Evo IX. The remaining two rallies held in Zagreb and its surroundings were won by foreign competitors – Italians Corrado Fontana and Renzo Casazza, along with Bulgarians Krum Donchev and Peter Yordanov.

After three successfully organized ERC events in Zagreb, the economic recession has caused the relocation of the race to Rijeka. In 2010, Croatia Rally was organized by the Automotive Association of Primorje-Gorski Kotar County, and in the next two years by local AC MRC. Special stages were held in Gorski Kotar, Učka, Ćićarija, Istria, and particularly attractive was Super special stage at Opatija Circuit.

In 2013, Croatia Rally moved again. This time to Istria and the town of Poreč, which is the host and co-organizer of the event. The rally was organized by the Croatian Car and Karting Federation and the special stages were driven at Učka, Ćićarija and in the triangle of the cities of Buzet, Motovun and Pazin.

The most wins in the history of Croatia Rally were achieved by Slovenians, driver Branislav Kuzmič and co-driver Rudi Šali, each with five victories. They are followed by the Croatian crew Juraj Šebalj - Toni Klinc with four victories and Croatian driver Tihomir Filipović and his co-driver Davor Devunić, with three victories each.

WRC 

On October 10, 2020, FIA World Motorsport Council has confirmed Croatia Rally as a new round of the World Rally Championship. The country is set to become the thirty-fourth nation to stage a championship round in the WRC. FIA President Jean Todt congratulated Croatian Automobile & Karting Federation president Davorin Štetner and pointed out that successful including in the 2021 calendar was possible thanks to support of Mayor of Zagreb and Croatian Government. The dates for Croatia Rally 2021 were from April 22 until April 25. Rally Headquarters, start and finish podium will be in Zagreb and itinerary will pass through Karlovac County, Zagreb County and Krapina-Zagorje County. The surface of Special Stages is tarmac.

The idea of bringing WRC to Croatia was born by Daniel Šaškin in 2013 while Croatia Rally was part of the European Rally Championship. 
Lobbying for the WRC in Croatia began in 2015 thanks to Zrinko Gregurek, Secretary General of CCKF at the time, as well as a member of World Motor Sport Council (WMSC) since 2009. From 2015 to 2020, Gregurek lobbied very strongly and continuously, at the end successfully, for the award of WRC to Croatia. 
After Jean Tod's visit to Zagreb in July 2020, during the next WMSC meeting held in October, the decision on Croatia's inclusion in the FIA WRC Calendar 2021 was adopted. Immediately after the end of the WMSC meeting, Gregurek sent this notice to the Croatian Car and Karting Federation.

List of winners

Sourced in part from:

References

External links
Croatia Rally

 
Sport in Yugoslavia
Rally competitions in Croatia
Croatia
World Rally Championship rallies
Recurring sporting events established in 1974